Two-Man Submarine is a 1944 American action film directed by Lew Landers and written by Griffin Jay and Leslie T. White. The film stars Tom Neal, Ann Savage, J. Carrol Naish, Robert B. Williams, Abner Biberman and George Lynn. The film was released on March 16, 1944, by Columbia Pictures.

Plot

Cast          
Tom Neal as Jerry Evans
Ann Savage as Pat Benson
J. Carrol Naish as Dr. Augustus Hadley
Robert B. Williams as Walt Hedges
Abner Biberman as Gabe Fabian
George Lynn as Norman Fosmer
Alex Havier as Fuzzytop

References

External links
 

1944 films
American action films
1940s action films
Columbia Pictures films
Films directed by Lew Landers
American black-and-white films
1940s English-language films
1940s American films
World War II films made in wartime